Lady MAGA is a character created by Ryan Woods, a political activist, social media influencer, and drag artist who supported Donald Trump during the United States presidential election, 2020. Ryan Woods is a resident of Salt Lake City, Utah.

Performer
Ryan Woods was raised in Salt Lake City, Utah as a member of the Church of Jesus Christ of Latter-day Saints. By the late 2010s, Ryan Woods had established a reputation in the small community of drag queens in Salt Lake City, Utah for his characterizations of Disney Princesses. Woods – who is gay – said that he felt ostracized when he decided to vocalize his support for Donald Trump to friends within the LGBTQI community in the mid 2010s.

Character

Debut
In August 2019, in posts to his social media accounts, Woods unveiled the Lady MAGA character declaring that "I support President Trump, and I believe that together we can make America gay … I mean great again!" According to Woods, his motivation for creating the Lady MAGA character was out of concern for the future of gun rights in the United States.

"MAGA" is an abbreviation for "Make America Great Again", a campaign slogan used by the Donald Trump 2016 presidential campaign and Donald Trump 2020 presidential campaign.

Appearances
Lady MAGA attended a number of Donald Trump, and other political, rallies in Utah during the 2020 United States presidential election, and addressed rallies organized by gay supporters of Trump in Los Angeles and Nashville in October 2020. She also appeared at the Conservative Political Action Conference in March 2020 in National Harbor, Maryland, among other conservative political events. Woods was present during a confrontation between supporters and opponents of Donald Trump in San Francisco's Mission District in early 2020, described by Mission Local as "a tense and bizarre scene".

Reception
Woods' unveiling of the Lady MAGA character was generally unwelcome by many drag queens in Utah, though the Salt Lake City Weekly also noted that, though they disagreed with him, some felt Woods was "brave" for taking a political stand at odds with that generally accepted by the larger LGBTQI community.

Woods has said that he is aware some Trump supporters were uncomfortable with his presence at Donald Trump campaign rallies but that he was generally "left alone" and that he "felt like the beauty of America is there's room for everyone, even people who might not want to bake me a cake at their bakery".

When he attended a demonstration to overturn the election in Freedom Plaza in November 2020, speaker Nick Fuentes pointed him out and said, "That is disgusting! I don't want to see that!" causing part of the crowd to chant "Shame!"

See also
 Log Cabin Republicans
 Lucian Wintrich, a political activist who organized a "Twinks for Trump" unofficial campaign event in 2016
 Pink Pistols
 Obama Girl, a character performed by Amber Lee Ettinger who supported the Barack Obama 2008 presidential campaign

References

External links
 

American drag queens
American gun rights activists
Donald Trump 2020 presidential campaign
Politics of Utah
LGBT conservatism in the United States
LGBT YouTubers
Male critics of feminism
21st-century LGBT people
Year of birth missing (living people)
Living people
People from Salt Lake City